Jake Waters (born March 20, 1992) is an American football quarterback who is currently an assistant coach at Iowa State. He played college football at Kansas State and was the Wildcats starting quarterback from 2013 to 2014.

Early years

College career
Waters started his college career at Iowa Western Community College where he was a two-year starter, 2012 National Champion, First-team All-American, and set the record for completion percentage (73.3), breaking the former record of Cam Newton.

In 2013, he transferred to Kansas State where he beat out Daniel Sams for the starting job. He passed for 2,469 yards with 18 touchdowns and nine interceptions. He also had six rushing touchdowns. Waters returned as a starter in 2014. He finished the year with 3,501 passing yards, 22 passing touchdowns, seven interceptions and nine rushing touchdowns.

Professional career
 Philadelphia Eagles

Seattle Seahawks
Waters was signed by the Seattle Seahawks on August 18, 2015, after an injury to incumbent backup quarterback Tarvaris Jackson.

Hamilton Tiger-Cats
Waters signed with the Hamilton Tiger-Cats in April 2016. He dressed in all three of the Tiger-Cats' games as a backup before being traded to Saskatchewan.

Saskatchewan Roughriders
Waters was traded for a negotiation list player on July 9, 2016.

References

External links
Official bio at Kansas State
ESPN player page

Living people
1992 births
American football quarterbacks
Canadian football quarterbacks
American players of Canadian football
Iowa Western Reivers football players
Kansas State Wildcats football players
Jacksonville Jaguars players
Seattle Seahawks players
Hamilton Tiger-Cats players
Saskatchewan Roughriders players
All-American college football players
Players of American football from Iowa
People from Council Bluffs, Iowa